Pray Away is a 2021 American documentary film produced and directed by Kristine Stolakis. It follows survivors of conversion therapy, and former leaders. Jason Blum and Ryan Murphy serve as executive producers.

It had its world premiere at the Tribeca Film Festival on June 16, 2021. It was released on August 3, 2021, by Netflix.

Synopsis
The film follows survivors and former leaders of conversion therapy, as some leaders grapple with their actions against others, while others come out.

Release
Pray Away had its world premiere at the Tribeca Film Festival on June 16, 2021. Prior to, Netflix acquired distribution rights to the film. It also screened at AFI Docs on June 24, 2021. It was previously set to screen at the Tribeca Film Festival in April 2020, and the Telluride Film Festival prior to their cancellations. It was released on August 3, 2021.

Critical reception
On review aggregator website Rotten Tomatoes, Pray Away holds an approval rating of 94% based on 32 reviews, with an average rating of 8.40/10. The site's critics consensus reads, "Pray Away presents a compassionate picture of the damage wrought by so-called conversion therapy – on its subjects as well as its proponents". On Metacritic, the film has a weighted average of 71 out of 100 based on 6 critics, indicating "generally favorable reviews".

Accolades

References

External links

2021 documentary films
2021 films
2021 LGBT-related films
American LGBT-related films
American documentary films
Blumhouse Productions films
Netflix original documentary films
Documentary films about LGBT topics
Documentary films about LGBT and Christianity
Films about conversion therapy
2020s English-language films
2020s American films